Deenish Island is an island  of the Atlantic Ocean belonging to County Kerry, Ireland.

Geography 
 
The island is 122 acres; its highest hill is at 144 m.
It's located in the Atlantic Ocean at around 1 km from Scariff Island and 6.1 km from Hogs Head, on the mainland.

History 
In 1837 on Deenish (which at that time was called Dinish) resided three families who mainly lived on the cattle which grazed on the island.
1911 census still reported six people living on the island.

See also

 List of islands of Ireland

References

External links

Scariff and Deenish, page on irishislands.info
The island page on iscoverireland.ie

Islands of County Kerry
Uninhabited islands of Ireland